

Protozoa

New taxa

Fungi

newly named

Plants

Newly named plants

Arthropoda

newly named arachnids

Newly named insects

Newly named fishes

Newly named amphibians

Archosauromorphs

Newly named dinosaurs
Data courtesy of George Olshevsky's dinosaur genera list.

Other archosauromorphs

Newly named birds

Plesiosaurs

New taxa

Pterosaurs

New taxa

Synapsids

Non-mammalian

References

 
2000s in paleontology
Paleontology